Bull Run District is a 2A athletic district under the Virginia High School League (VHSL).

Members
The district comprises eight Virginia high schools:
 
 Clarke County High School
 Mountain View High School (Shenandoah County, Virginia)
 Luray High School
 Madison County High School
 Page County High School 
 Rappahannock County High School 
 Strasburg High School

Former Members
 Manassas Park High School 
 William Monroe High School
 Central High School (Woodstock, Virginia)
 Warren County High School

References

Virginia High School League
Northern Virginia